Heinz Peter Günthardt (born 8 February 1959) is a retired tennis player from Switzerland.

Tennis player career
Günthardt won five singles titles during his professional career, including the Rotterdam WCT in 1980. The right-hander reached his career-high ATP singles ranking of world No. 22 in April 1986.

In doubles, he captured a total number of 30 titles. Günthardt won the men's doubles at the 1981 Roland Garros and the 1985 Wimbledon Championships with Balázs Taróczy, and the mixed doubles at the 1985 US Open with Martina Navratilova. He was also a member of the Swiss team at the 1988 Olympic Games.

Coaching career
Günthardt was the coach of Steffi Graf from the start of 1992 until the end of Graf's tennis playing career in July 1999, and he also worked briefly with Jelena Dokić and Jennifer Capriati.

From February to November 2010, he coached former world No. 1 Ana Ivanovic. He had not coached full-time since Graf's retirement in 1999. When Günthardt started coaching her, Ivanovic had dropped out of the WTA's top 20, and she dropped to a career low of world No. 65 in July 2010. During their partnership, Ivanovic recovered to world No. 17 before Günthardt ended his coaching relationship with her due to family responsibilities.

Günthardt has been has been captain of the Swiss Fed Cup team since March 2012. He reached the final with the team in 2021, and won the Cup in 2022.

Career statistics

Tour finals

Singles: 9 (5–4)

Doubles: 59 (30–29)

References

External links
 
 
 
 
 

1959 births
Living people
French Open champions
French Open junior champions
Olympic tennis players of Switzerland
Tennis players from Zürich
Swiss male tennis players
Swiss tennis coaches
Tennis players at the 1988 Summer Olympics
US Open (tennis) champions
Wimbledon champions
Wimbledon junior champions
Grand Slam (tennis) champions in men's doubles
Steffi Graf
Grand Slam (tennis) champions in boys' singles